His Own Home Town is a 1918 American silent drama film directed by Victor Schertzinger and written by Larry Evans. The film stars Charles Ray, Katherine MacDonald, Charles K. French, Otto Hoffman, Andrew Arbuckle, and Karl Formes. The film was released on May 27, 1918, by Paramount Pictures.

Plot
As described in a film magazine, an outcast from home, Jimmy Duncan (Ray) goes to New York City where, under an assumed name, he becomes famous as a playwright. His childhood sweetheart Carol (MacDonald), also goes to the city seeking success on the stage. On the death of Carol's father Jimmy inherits the Chronicle, a newspaper he had been publishing in Worcester. Jimmy returns to clean out the corrupt gang of city politicians using the paper. The extra he prints brings the politicians to his office, including Jimmy's own father, the Rev. John Duncan (Arbuckle). Upon their promise to leave town within the next twenty-four hours, Jimmy suppresses the next edition of the newspaper. His play is also accepted and Carol becomes famous as its leading lady.

Cast
Charles Ray as Jimmy Duncan
Katherine MacDonald as Carol Landis
Charles K. French as T. Elihu Banks
Otto Hoffman as Tivotson
Andrew Arbuckle as Rev. John Duncan
Karl Formes as David Landis
Milton Ross as Justice Jameson

Reception
Like many American films of the time, His Own Home Town was subject to restrictions and cuts by city and state film censorship boards. For example, the Chicago Board of Censors cut, in Reel 2, the second and third gambling scenes, Reel 3, third and fourth gambling scenes, Reel 5, shooting Jimmy Duncan.

References

External links 
 

1918 films
1910s English-language films
Silent American drama films
1918 drama films
Paramount Pictures films
Films directed by Victor Schertzinger
American black-and-white films
American silent feature films
1910s American films